Girl Peace Scouts, a New Zealand group that merged with the GirlGuiding New Zealand
Girl Peace Scouts, an Australian scouting group that existed from 1909 to the 1920s with the final Girl Peace Scouts troop in Lindasfarne Tasmania ceased operating in 1935.